The Governor of Kaluga Oblast is the head of government of Kaluga Oblast, a federal subject of Russia.

The position was introduced in 1991 as Head of Administration. The title of office was changed to Governor after the Charter of Kaluga Oblast was adopted on 27 March 1996.

List of officeholders

References 

Politics of Kaluga Oblast
 
Kaluga